Shane Withington (born 22 August 1958) is an Australian actor, notable for roles theatre TV and film.

Career
Withington is best known for roles in TV serials, with two famous character portrayal's, these include his role as Brenden Jones, a farmer, nurse and subsequently the Deputy Matron of the fictional Wandin Valley in the television series A Country Practice from 1982 until 1986 the Deputy Matron of Wandin Valley Hospital; 

Withington, first appeared in TV serial Home and Away as a guest character called Colin, before being given the permanent part of cranky but warm-hearted surf lifesaver and patrol officer John Palmer in the series, in 2009 initially as a 3-month stand-alone stint, a role he has now played for 10 years.

He has also featured as well as Willing and Abel, as Abel Moore, and the sitcom The Family Business.

He had a guest star appearance in film Strange Bedfellows,in 2004 starring Paul Hogan and Michael Caton.

In 2008, he was in the BBC drama Out of the Blue, playing the detective in charge of investigating a murder. Since 2009, he has had the regular 

Withington co-starred in the play The Boys Next Door in 1992.

Filmography

Films

Television

Personal life 
He is married to Anne Tenney, who played his character's wife Molly Jones on A Country Practice.

References

External links
 

1958 births
20th-century Australian male actors
21st-century Australian male actors
Australian male film actors
Australian male television actors
Living people
Logie Award winners
People from Queensland
Blinky Bill